Agira is a town and  in the province of Enna, Sicily (southern Italy). It is located in the mid-valley of the River Salso,  from Enna. Until 1861 it was called San Filippo d'Argiriò, in honour of its saint Philip of Agira.

The modern city overlies the ancient one of which few traces remain.

History

Agira stands on the site of the ancient Sicel city of Agyrion ( - Agyrion), or Agyrium, and Agyrina, 

On the top of the mountain where the castle stands, excavations have brought to light buildings dated between the sixth and fourth centuries BC with the presence of polychrome plaster and remains of the mint for coins.

Diodorus Siculus was born here and credits Heracles with the foundation of sacred precincts of Iolaus and of Geryon, and the creation of a nearby lake. In the mid-fifth century, Agyrium was the first Sicilian city to mint bronze coinage in the Greek fashion.

In the 4th c. BC it was ruled by tyrants, one of whom, Agyris, was the most powerful ruler in the centre of Sicily. He was a contemporary of Dionysius the Elder, and with him successfully resisted the Carthaginian forces led by Mago when they invaded the territory of Agyrium in 392 BC. Agira was not colonised by the Greeks until the Corinthian general Timoleon drove out the last tyrant in 339 BC, settled 10,000 Greeks, according to Diodorus Siculus, and erected various splendid buildings.

In around 287 BC Phintias of Agrigentum conquered the city, but after he had shown himself a bloodthirsty murderer, Agyrion was the first city to revolt after which he changed his ways to a more humane rule.

The Romans called it Agyrium. Cicero described it thus:
“And first be briefed on the illustrious and faithful people of Agyrium. Agyrium is among the first as an honest city in Sicily, whose men were, before this commissioner came, rich and among the best farmers."

Under Roman control it underwent a decline like other Sicilian cities as a result of the misrule of Verres and the heavy taxation imposed on it. 

One of the only two Greek inscriptions from Agyrium marks the final resting-place of a "Diodorus the son of Apollonius." 

In 1063, it was taken by the Normans under Count Roger I of Sicily (Ruggero in Italian), who defeated the Saracens near the river Salso. Agira is mentioned by Muhammad al-Idrisi by the name Shanta Fīlibb (i.e., Saint Philip of Agira), written as شنت فيلب in the Arabic script.

Agira passed through the hands of the Hohenstaufen, the Angevines and Aragonese, and in about 1400 it became state property of Sicily. Over the years the town has been influenced by Spanish and Jewish arrivals, both leaving their architectural mark, the latter a synagogue.

Main sights

The town has a number of notable churches:
Chiesa Madre ("Mother Church"): Norman church dedicated to Santa Maria Maggiore
Santa Margherita: Norman church founded in 13th century, but rebuilt over centuries, is the largest in the diocese, with thirteen altars
San Filippo: church with central nave and two aisles, and contains paintings by Olivo SozziSant'Antonio da Padova:16th-century churchSant'Antonio Abate: 16th-century church containing fourteen small paintings of the Venetian schoolSan Salvatore: church with Gothic bell-tower.

There is also an Arab–Byzantine castle, later rebuilt by the Hohenstaufen, of which two towers still stand.

The Pozzillo artificial lake lies near the town in a eucalyptus wood, and provides a habitat for a large variety of birds, and a way-stage for migrators. Another reserve – the Riserva di Piano della Corte – has been created in the Erean Mountains, and the Mediterranean forest of the Vallone di Piano della Corte is scheduled to become another reserve. The area also contains sulphur springs.

Economy

The town is a centre of agriculture: productions include cereals, almonds, olives, and grapes.  The large areas of pasture also make possible the breeding of cattle, sheep, and horses.

Transportation
There is a railway station south of the town.

International relations

 
Agira is twinned with:
 Żebbuġ, Malta

References

External links
Official website 
Agira — from La Sicilia in dettaglio — Sicily in full detail''
Gallery of photographs of Agira
Richard Stillwell, ed. Princeton Encyclopædia of Classical Sites, 1976: "Agyrion (Agira), Sicily"
History of Agira

Municipalities of the Province of Enna
339 BC
330s BC establishments
4th-century BC establishments in Italy
Populated places established in the 4th century BC
Dorian colonies in Magna Graecia